Danville is a city in Harper County, Kansas, United States.  As of the 2020 census, the population of the city was 29.

History
Danville was originally known as Odell. It was change to Coleville in 1881 and platted in 1880 by Mrs. J. E. Cole. When Mrs. Cole later sold the town site, the name was changed to Danville, after Danville, Ohio.

Geography
Danville is located at  (37.286771, -97.892715).

Demographics

2010 census
As of the census of 2010, there were 38 people, 19 households, and 8 families residing in the city. The racial makeup of the city was 100.0% White.

There were 19 households, of which 15.8% had children under the age of 18 living with them, 31.6% were married couples living together, 10.5% had a female householder with no husband present, and 57.9% were non-families. 42.1% of all households were made up of individuals, and 10.5% had someone living alone who was 65 years of age or older. The average household size was 2.00 and the average family size was 2.88.

The median age in the city was 47.5 years. 21.1% of residents were under the age of 18; 2.5% were between the ages of 18 and 24; 23.8% were from 25 to 44; 36.9% were from 45 to 64; and 15.8% were 65 years of age or older. The gender makeup of the city was 47.4% male and 52.6% female.

2000 census
As of the census of 2000, there were 59 people, 26 households, and 17 families residing in the city. The racial makeup of the city was 96.61% White and 3.39% Native American.

There were 26 households, out of which 23.1% had children under the age of 18 living with them, 53.8% were married couples living together, 7.7% had a female householder with no husband present, and 30.8% were non-families. 23.1% of all households were made up of individuals, and 3.8% had someone living alone who was 65 years of age or older. The average household size was 2.27 and the average family size was 2.67.

In the city, the population was spread out, with 20.3% under the age of 18, 20.3% from 18 to 24, 18.6% from 25 to 44, 22.0% from 45 to 64, and 18.6% who were 65 years of age or older. The median age was 36 years. For every 100 females, there were 103.4 males. For every 100 females age 18 and over, there were 135.0 males.

The median income for a household in the city was $20,313, and the median income for a family was $19,583. Males had a median income of $35,625 versus $0 for females. The per capita income for the city was $10,743. There were 13.3% of families and 12.2% of the population living below the poverty line, including 11.8% of under eighteens and none of those over 64.

Education
The community is served by Chaparral USD 361 public school district.

References

Further reading

External list
 Danville - Directory of Public Officials
 Danville city map, KDOT

Cities in Kansas
Cities in Harper County, Kansas